Joseph Francis Devlin (19 January 1900 – 27 October 1988) was an Irish male badminton player.

Badminton career
Devlin is the second most successful player ever in the All England Open Badminton Championships with 18 titles between 1925 and 1931, including three triple championships in 1926, 1927 and 1929. He also won four Irish Championships.

Despite being Irish he was part of the English team that toured Canada in 1925 to promote the sport on behalf of the Canadian Badminton Association which had recently been formed in 1921. He was living in Beckenham, Kent and worked as a Salesman. He was also part of a second English touring team that visited Canada during 1930. A match was held at the Granite Club in Toronto which England won 7–2.

Awards
Frank Devlin was a right-handed player, and was included in the Badminton Hall of Fame in 1997, together with his daughter Judy Devlin.

Major achievements

References

General

ChinaBadminton: Frank Devlin (爱尔兰)

1900 births
1988 deaths
Irish male badminton players